Cheikh Tiberghien (born 8 January 2000) is a French rugby union player who plays as winger with ASM Clermont Auvergne.

Biography 
Having played in junior categories with the Aviron Bayonnais, moved to ASM Clermont Auvergne in 2019.

References

External links 

 
 Calum Randle on allrugby.com

Living people
Rugby union fullbacks
Rugby union wings
ASM Clermont Auvergne players
French rugby union players
French rugby sevens players
2000 births
Rugby sevens players at the 2018 Summer Youth Olympics